The 2014 World Rally Championship was the 42nd season of the World Rally Championship, an auto racing championship recognised by the Fédération Internationale de l'Automobile as the highest class of international rallying. Teams and drivers contested thirteen rallies across four continents, competing for the FIA World Rally Championships for Drivers and Manufacturers. The WRC-2, WRC-3 and Junior WRC championships all ran in support of the premier championship.

The 2014 season saw Hyundai return to the championship as a manufacturer for the first time since the 2003 season. The Rally of Poland returned to the calendar after a five-year absence, replacing the Acropolis Rally.

Sébastien Ogier and his team, Volkswagen Motorsport, secured both Drivers and Manufacturers title for a second consecutive time. Ogier secured the title with a round to spare by winning in Rally de Catalunya, Ogier's teammate Jari-Matti Latvala and Volkswagen Motorsport II's Andreas Mikkelsen finished the championship in second and third. The Citroën World Rally Team was second at the Manufacturers' Championship.

Calendar
The 2014 calendar was announced at a meeting of the FIA World Motor Sport Council in Croatia on 27 September 2013. The 2014 championship was contested over thirteen rounds in Europe, North America, South America and Oceania.

Calendar changes
 Rally Australia and Rally New Zealand abandoned the event-sharing arrangement established in 2008 that saw each event host a round of the championship every other year. After hosting an event in 2013, Rally Australia remains on the calendar throughout 2014 and 2015 before the arrangement is due to be renegotiated.
 The Rallye Monte Carlo relocated its base from Valence in the French province of Rhône-Alpes to the town of Gap in the neighbouring province of Hautes-Alpes.
 The 2014 calendar saw the Rally of Poland return to the championship for the first time since 2009. The event also crossed the border into Lithuania for one day of competition. Its inclusion came at the expense of the Acropolis Rally, which was removed after struggling with its financial obligations to the championship. The Acropolis Rally later moved to the European Rally Championship for the 2014 season. The rallies of Brazil and China had also been considered for inclusion on the WRC calendar before the FIA approved of the Rally of Poland.

Teams and drivers

The following teams and drivers are scheduled to compete in the World Rally Championship during the 2014 season:

Team changes
 Citroën will scale back its involvement in the championship, limiting its programme to two full-time works-supported cars, with a third car entered in selected events. As a result, its customer car programme will be brought to an end. The decision to reduce its commitment to the WRC stemmed from Citroën's expansion into the World Touring Car Championship and the logistical challenges of establishing itself in a new series.
 Martin Prokop's M-Sport-supported Czech National Team will expand to enter a second Ford Fiesta RS WRC at selected events throughout the season. The second car will compete under the name "Slovakia World Rally Team".
 Korean car manufacturer Hyundai will return to the championship as a manufacturer team, competing with the i20 WRC. The Hyundai World Rally Team had originally planned to compete with two full-time entries, but later expanded to include two part-time entries as well. Hyundai had previously competed in the WRC with the Hyundai Accent WRC from 2000 to 2003.
 The Qatar World Rally Team and Lotos Team WRC will not start the season.

Driver changes
 Nasser Al-Attiyah will not start the season after the Qatar World Rally Team did not submit an entry and the Qatari government ended its sponsorship of M-Sport.
 Chris Atkinson will join Hyundai on a part-time basis, competing in selected events including Rally Australia. Atkinson will share the team's second entry with Dani Sordo and Juho Hänninen.
 2012 Super 2000 World Rally Champion Craig Breen will make his debut in a World Rally Car-specification car at the Rally of Sweden
 Elfyn Evans, who won the Junior World Rally Championship in 2012 and placed seventh overall in the 2013 World Rally Championship-2 season will join M-Sport.
 Juho Hänninen, who contested three events in 2013 with Qatar World Rally Team, will compete at selected events in 2014 with Hyundai. Hänninen will share the car with Dani Sordo and Chris Atkinson. Hänninen will make his first appearance for the team at the Rally of Sweden.
 Mikko Hirvonen lost his seat at Citroën after two seasons with the team. He will return to M-Sport, the team he competed with from 2006 to 2011, when it was known as the Ford World Rally Team.
 Former Formula One driver and reigning World Rally Championship-2 champion Robert Kubica will join the sport's top tier of competition in 2014, driving an M-Sport-prepared Ford Fiesta RS WRC as a satellite team of M-Sport.
 After taking part in selected events during the 2013 season, nine-time World Drivers' Champion Sébastien Loeb will leave the World Rally Championship, moving to the World Touring Car Championship with Citroën Racing.
 Kris Meeke will return to full-time competition, joining Citroën after making guest appearances in the team's third car in 2013.
 Slovakian driver Jaroslav Melichárek will make his WRC debut, driving a Ford Fiesta RS WRC run by the Jipocar Czech National Team under the name "Slovakia World Rally Team". Melichárek had previously campaigned a Citroën C4 WRC in the Czech and Slovakian national championships before joining the team.
 Thierry Neuville will leave the Qatar World Rally Team to join Hyundai's works team.
 Evgeny Novikov lost his seat with M-Sport. He ruled out contesting the full 2014 season as he focused on securing funds for a drive in 2015, but expressed a willingness to make guest appearances at selected events.
 Mads Østberg will leave M-Sport after two seasons competing for Ford-backed teams M-Sport and Adapta. He will be driving for Citroën alongside Kris Meeke.
 2011 Production Car World Rally Champion Hayden Paddon will compete part-time throughout the 2014 season, driving an i20 WRC.
 Dani Sordo will leave Citroën for Hyundai, sharing the team's second entry with Chris Atkinson and Juho Hänninen. Sordo will be the first of the three to drive the i20 WRC, starting the Rallye Monte Carlo.
 Ott Tänak will return to the World Rally Championship, contesting selected events in a privately entered Ford Fiesta RS WRC whilst campaigning in the WRC-2 series with a Fiesta R5.

Changes
 Pirelli will return to the World Rally Championship as a tyre supplier in 2014, joining existing suppliers Michelin, DMACK and Hankook. Pirelli was previously the exclusive supplier for the championship from 2008 to 2010.
 The rules governing the running order for a day's stages will change in 2014, after the FIA expressed dissatisfaction with the qualifying stage format introduced in 2012, whereby the fastest drivers during the event shakedown were given the opportunity to choose their starting position for the rally as a means of discouraging drivers from stopping on a stage in order to gain a more-favourable starting position the next day. The final format was decided upon at the December 2013 meeting of the World Motor Sport Council, with WRC and WRC-2 drivers starting in their provisional championship classification for the first day of the rally, before starting the second and third days in reverse order of the provisional rally classification. Cars that have retired on one day and are restarting the next under Rally-2 regulations will be placed after the WRC and WRC-2 driver groups.
 Manufacturers will no longer be required to nominate one permanent driver for the season, but will instead be obliged to nominate one driver for a minimum of ten events, leaving them free to rotate drivers through the remaining events as they so choose.
 Rallies must now follow a fixed format. There will be a ceremonial start on Thursday, with the last stage run as the Power Stage. The length of the Power Stage must be at least ten kilometers.
 All competitors registered in the Championships–WRC, WRC-2, WRC-3 and the Junior WRC—will be obliged to use a colour-coded windscreen sticker to distinguish its category.

Rally summaries

Round 1 — Monte-Carlo Rally

The first round of the season was run in difficult conditions, with heavy rain making for a slippery surface and low visibility. Former Formula One driver Robert Kubica took an early lead, but fell behind on the first leg when he made the wrong tyre choice. French privateer Bryan Bouffier – who won the event in 2011, when it was a round of the Intercontinental Rally Challenge – took control and led the field at the end of the first day. Bouffier came under pressure from reigning World Champion Sébastien Ogier on the second day, and ultimately lost the lead when he spun during the afternoon stages, whilst Kubica crashed out. Ogier's rally was not without incident, with the Volkswagen driver surviving several close encounters with walls as he tried to recover from a poor start. Ogier went on to win the rally by over a minute, with Bouffier second and Kris Meeke finishing third. Hyundai's return to the World Rally Championship started and ended poorly as Thierry Neuville crashed heavily on the first stage and teammate Dani Sordo was forced to retire with a suspected electrical fault.

Round 2 — Rally Sweden

Round 3 — Rally Mexico

Round 4 — Rally de Portugal

WRC leader Sébastien Ogier was the first on the road in the first leg, but his disadvantage was decreased since in the days before the rally it rained, and the Algarve roads were a combination of dry and a little moist tracks, which led to difficulties for drivers to choose the right tire compound.
Sébastien Ogier led the rally since Lisbon SSS until the last stage of the first leg (SS7), finishing behind Mikko Hirvonen (1st) and Ott Tänak. In the middle Dani Sordo was in the lead after winning SS2 and SS3 with his Hyundai i20 WRC.
In the 2nd leg Sébastien Ogier imposed a demonic pace retaking the lead and quickly pulled out of Mikko Hirvonen. Mads Østberg finished in the podium last place. Dani Sordo after a promising start, retired at the beginning of the last day (due to mechanical when he was heading do start SS14) when he was in overall fourth place.
This rally was marked by the high number of crashes between the top drivers: Jari-Matti Latvala, Kris Meeke, Elfyn Evans and Robert Kubica (who would crash again in 2nd leg).

Round 5 — Rally Argentina

Round 6 — Rally Italia Sardegna

Round 7 — Rally Poland

Round 8 — Rally Finland

Round 9 — Rallye Deutschland

Round 10 — Rally Australia

Round 11 — Rallye de France Alsace

Round 12 — Rally Catalunya

Round 13 — Wales Rally GB

Notes:
  – The Monte Carlo Rally was shortened when a competitor stopped on Stage 14, blocking traffic and forcing organisers to abandon the stage.
  – The Rally Sweden was shortened when a computer error disabled the timing system, preventing one of the stages from being run.

Results and standings

FIA World Rally Championship for Drivers

Points are awarded to the top ten classified finishers. There are also three bonus points awarded to the winner of the Power Stage, two points for second place and one for third.

FIA World Rally Championship for Co-Drivers

FIA World Rally Championship for Manufacturers

References

External links

Official website of the World Rally Championship
 FIA World Rally Championship 2014 at ewrc-results.com

World Rally Championship seasons
World Rally Championship
World Rally Championship